Degg is a surname. Notable people with the surname include:

Jakki Degg (born 1978), British glamour model and actress
Randy Degg (born 1984), American football player
Roland Degg (1909–2001), British battalion commander during World War II

See also
Dagg
Deng (disambiguation)
Pegg